The Land Glacier is a broad, heavily crevassed glacier, about  long, descending into Land Bay in Marie Byrd Land, Antarctica. It was discovered by the U.S. Antarctic Service (1939–41) and named for Rear Admiral Emory S. Land, Chairman of the U.S. Maritime Commission.

See also
 List of glaciers in the Antarctic
 List of Antarctic ice streams

Further reading 
 K.C. JEZEK, H.X. LIU, Structure of southeastern Antarctic Peninsula ice shelves and ice tongues from synthetic aperture radar imagery, Journal of Glaciology, Vol. 51, No. 174, 2005

External links 

 Land Glacier on USGS website
 Land Glacier on SCAR website

References

Ice streams of Antarctica
Glaciers of Marie Byrd Land